Paul Alois Lakra (11 July 1955 – 15 June 2021) was an Indian prelate of the Catholic Church who served as the bishop of Gumla from 2006 until his death in 2021.

Lakra died in Ranchi on 15 June 2021, aged 65.

See also 

 List of Catholic bishops of India

References 

1955 births
2021 deaths
People from Ranchi
Bishops appointed by Pope Benedict XVI
21st-century Roman Catholic bishops in India